Close to the Edge is the fifth studio album (sixth overall) by the American alternative rock band Blessid Union of Souls, released on September 16, 2008.

Music
Close to the Edge contains twelve songs, eight of which are lifted from their previous album Perception. "I'll Be There" is a relatively simple song analogous to the band's earlier work. "Back from the Dead" was written about recovery from addiction. Lead vocalist Eliot Sloan stated of the conception of the title:

Note: The song If You Were Mine was initially recorded by Marcos Hernandez for his debut album C About Me in 2005.

Track listing

References

2008 albums
Blessid Union of Souls albums